Gladys Mercedes Nordenstrom (May 23, 1924 – July 5, 2016) was an American composer.

Life
Gladys Nordenstrom was born in Mora, Minnesota. She studied music at the Institute of Fine Arts at Hamline University in Saint Paul, Minnesota, where she received  bachelor's and master's degrees. She studied under Austrian composer Ernst Krenek there and then married him in 1950, becoming his third wife. After completing her studies, Nordenstrom worked as an elementary school teacher until she moved with Krenek to California.

In the following years, she accompanied her husband to visiting professorships in various locations and sometimes collaborated on musical works.

After his death in 1991, she was instrumental in the foundation of the Ernst Krenek Institute in 1998 and the private foundation Krems die Ernst Krenek in 2004 in Vienna, Austria. She expended much effort to find ways to promote her late husband's musical performances and recordings.

In 2006 Gladys Nordenstrom was awarded the Decoration of Honour for Services to the Republic of Austria.

Nordenstrom died on July 5, 2016, in Palm Springs, California, aged 92. At the time of her death, she was still hard at work on a project to record the complete cycle of Krenek piano concertos.

Works
Selected works include:

Theme and Variations for piano  (1944)
No Leaf is Left for soprano and piano  (1945) — text: Elisabeth Coatsworth
First Sonata for piano  (ca. 1946) 
Rondo for flute and piano  (1948)
This Life for mezzo-soprano and piano  (1949) — text: R. M. Rilke
Antitheses for choir and orchestra  (1966) — text: Gladys Nordenstrom
El Greco Fantasy for string orchestra  (1966, rev. 1969)
Elegy in Memoriam Robert F. Kennedy for orchestra  (1968)
Sextet for flute/piccolo, oboe, clarinet in B-flat, bass clarinet, bassoon, horn  (1969)
Work for Orchestra No.3  (1974/75)
Zeit XXIV for high voice and piano  (1976) — text: Renata Pandula
Trio for violin, clarinet and piano  (1978)
Parabola of Light for women's choir and piano  (1979) — text: Gladys Nordenstrom
Signals from Nowhere for organ and tape recorder  (1981)

References

1924 births
2016 deaths
20th-century classical composers
American women classical composers
American classical composers
American classical pianists
American women classical pianists
Recipients of the Decoration for Services to the Republic of Austria
Pupils of Ernst Krenek
People from Mora, Minnesota
20th-century American women musicians
20th-century American composers
20th-century women composers
21st-century American women